The 1996 FA Women's Cup Final was the 27th final of the FA Women's Cup, England's primary cup competition for women's football teams. It was the fifth final to be held under the direct control of the Football Association (FA).

Match

Summary

Future England goalkeeper Rachel Brown played in her first final at 15 years old. Croydon Women defeated Liverpool via penalty shootout.

Details
<onlyinclude>

References

FA
Women's FA Cup finals
April 1996 sports events in the United Kingdom
1996 sports events in London
FA Women's Cup Final 1996
FA Women's Cup Final 1996
FA Women's Cup Final 1996